Green belt or greenbelt is an area of protected open space around an urban area.

Green belt may also refer to:

Open spaces

Canada
Greenbelt (Golden Horseshoe), a protected area in the Greater Toronto Area
Greenbelt (Ottawa), a protected area near Ottawa

United States
Barton Creek Greenbelt, Austin, Texas
Staten Island Greenbelt, a system of contiguous public parkland and natural areas in New York City, New York
Long Beach Green Belt path, an open space habitat for native plants in California

Other places
European Green Belt, along the corridor of the former Iron Curtain
German Green Belt, straddling the former East-West border in Germany
Green belt (United Kingdom), a policy for controlling urban growth, includes a list of green belts in the United Kingdom
Metropolitan Green Belt, a protected area around London, England, United Kingdom
Santo Domingo Greenbelt, a greenbelt surrounding the city of Santo Domingo, Dominican Republic
Green belt (Rennes), a protected area around Rennes, France
Green Belt of Vitoria-Gasteiz, Álava, Spain

Places
Greenbelt, Maryland, a city near Washington, D.C., named for its greenbelt
Greenbelt station, a Washington Metro and MARC Train station
Greenbelt Historic District, a National Historic Landmark
Greenbelt Homes, Inc., a historic housing cooperative
Greenbelt News Review, a cooperative newspaper
Greenbelt Park, managed and operated by the National Park Service

Roads and paths
Green Belt (Pittsburgh), part of the Allegheny County belt system, Pennsylvania, U.S.
Boise greenbelt, an urban trail system in Boise, Idaho, U.S.

Other uses
A Green Belt, a token in Sir Gawain and the Green Knight
Bering Sea Green Belt, the continental shelf break area of the Bering Sea
Green Belt of Glory, a set of memorial facilities at the forefront of the battle for Leningrad
Green Belt Movement, an organization based that focuses on environmental conservation and community development in Kenya
Green Belt Theory, a conspiracy theory
Greenbelt (Ayala Center), a large shopping mall in Makati, Philippines
Greenbelt Alliance, a land conservation and urban planning organization in California, U.S.
Greenbelt Festival, an annual Christian arts festival in England
Six Sigma Green Belt, a certification level of the Six Sigma processes

See also
The Residences at Greenbelt, a residential skyscraper complex in Makati, Philippines
Greenway (landscape)